Spanish Mission may refer to:
Spanish Colonial Revival architecture
Mission Revival Style architecture
Spanish missions, institutions established by Catholic religious orders under the auspices of the Spanish crown to convert indigenous peoples of the Americas and Asia